Priceville is the third largest municipality in Morgan County, Alabama, United States and is included in the Decatur Metropolitan Area, as well as the Huntsville-Decatur Combined Statistical Area. The 2020 census counted a population of 3,513, up from 2,658 in 2010.

Priceville was incorporated in 1975.

History
Priceville was settled in the 1820s and is named for the Price family, who played prominent roles in its early history. The community remained sparsely populated until the 1950s, when the construction of Interstate 65 brought rapid economic expansion.

Geography
Priceville is located in northern Morgan County at  (34.521001, -86.879678). It is bordered to the west by Decatur, the county seat. State Route 67 runs through the town center, leading northwest  to the center of Decatur and southeast  to Somerville. Interstate 65 passes through the western portion of Priceville, connecting the town with Cullman  to the south and Athens  to the north. The Wheeler National Wildlife Refuge is situated between Priceville and Decatur. The Tennessee River (Wheeler Lake) passes just north of Priceville.

Ginhouse Branch runs through the center of town, flowing north to the Tennessee River.

Demographics

2020 census

As of the 2020 United States census, there were 3,512 people, 1,204 households, and 945 families residing in the town.

2010 census
As of the census of 2010, there were 2,658 people, 620 households, and 518 families residing in the town. The racial makeup of the town was 95.89% White, 2.27% Black or African American, 0.67% Native American, 0.18% Asian, 0.55% from other races, and 0.43% from two or more races. 1.23% of the population were Hispanic or Latino of any race.

There were 620 households, out of which 33.2% had children under the age of 18 living with them, 73.2% were married couples living together, 6.6% had a female householder with no husband present, and 16.3% were non-families. 13.5% of all households were made up of individuals, and 5.2% had someone living alone who was 65 years of age or older. The average household size was 2.63 and the average family size was 2.89.

In the town, the population was spread out, with 23.9% under the age of 18, 7.0% from 18 to 24, 29.7% from 25 to 44, 28.3% from 45 to 64, and 11.2% who were 65 years of age or older. The median age was 38 years. For every 100 females, there were 99.6 males. For every 100 females age 18 and over, there were 98.2 males.

The median income for a household in the town was $51,875, and the median income for a family was $55,885. Males had a median income of $37,679 versus $28,750 for females. The per capita income for the town was $22,056. About 2.2% of families and 5.6% of the population were below the poverty line, including 13.9% of those under age 18 and none of those age 65 or over.

References

External links

Towns in Morgan County, Alabama
Towns in Alabama
Decatur metropolitan area, Alabama
Huntsville-Decatur, AL Combined Statistical Area
Alabama populated places on the Tennessee River
1975 establishments in Alabama